The 2015–16 Tanzanian Premier League is the 51st season of top-tier football in Tanzania. The Young Africans are the defending champions after winning their 20th title last season.

Participating teams
Sixteen teams competed in the 2015–16 season.

Stadia and locations

League table

References

External links
tff.or.tz; League website at association's website
Page at fifa.com; League standings & results
RSSSF competition history

Tanzanian Premier League
Tanzanian Premier League
Tanzanian Premier League
Tanzania